The SD45 is a six-axle diesel-electric locomotive built by General Motors Electro-Motive Division between 1965 and 1971. It has an EMD 645E3 twenty-cylinder engine generating  on the same frame as the SD38, SD39, SD40, and SDP40. As of 2023, most SD45s have been retired, scrapped or rebuilt to SD40-2 standards.

Design 
1,260 were built for American railroads before the SD45-2 replaced it in 1972, along with the related SD45T-2 'Tunnel Motor'.

SD45s had several teething problems. Reliability was not as high as anticipated; the twenty-cylinder prime mover was prone to crankshaft failure from engine block flex. Though it produced  more than the 16-645E3 in the SD40, some railroads felt the extra horsepower wasn't worth it, even after EMD strengthened the block to eliminate crankshaft failures.  At low speeds, when tractive effort was adhesion-limited, the SD45 provided no advantage over the SD40.

Buyers included the Burlington Northern, Southern Pacific, Santa Fe, Pennsylvania Railroad, the Great Northern Railway, Union Pacific and the Northern Pacific Railway. Many SD45s still exist, some rebuilt with sixteen-cylinder 645s for lease companies. SD45s and SD45-2s owned by Montana Rail Link retain their 20-cylinder prime movers. Wisconsin Central used to roster a large fleet of SD45s, but its sale to CN has resulted in the retirement of the entire fleet, with mass scrappings. Montana Rail Link is also starting to sell some for scrap.

Original owners

Preservation 
 Great Northern 400, named "Hustle Muscle", was the first production SD45. It is preserved by the Great Northern Railway Historical Society, based out of Saint Paul, Minnesota. It was in active service on the Minnesota Transportation Museum's Osceola and St. Croix Valley Railway until it suffered a crankshaft failure in its original 20-645E3 engine, requiring a replacement engine to be installed. BNSF Railway overhauled a 20-645E3 engine from a retired ex-ATSF SD45-2 and donated and installed the new engine in January 2019.
 Erie Lackawanna  3607 is preserved at the St. Louis National Museum of Transportation. Restored to EL colors, this unit is a static display.
 Norfolk and Western  1776, a high-hood unit, is a static display at the Virginia Museum of Transportation.
 Northern Pacific 3617 is preserved at the Lake Superior Railroad Museum. It has been restored to active service. 
 Seaboard Coast Line  2024 is preserved at the Southern Appalachia Railway Museum and is currently painted in the Clinchfield Railroad scheme as of December 2017. 
 Southern Pacific  7457 is a static display at the Utah State Railroad Museum.
 Wisconsin Central  7525 is at the Illinois Railway Museum and is operable. It is one of two WC SD45 units to be painted in an Operation Lifesaver scheme.
Kansas City Southern  1200 is at the Rail Museum of Heroica Matamoros in Matamoros, Mexico on static display

References

Sources
 
 Pinkepank, Jerry. Diesel Spotters Guide 2.
 
 Diesel Spotter's Guide, Volume 2. Kalmbach, 1994.
 White, Dr. W. J. How Diesel Electric Locomotives Operate. Peat. 1998.

External links 

 EMD SD45 Original Owners

SD45
C-C locomotives
Diesel-electric locomotives of the United States
Railway locomotives introduced in 1965
Freight locomotives
Standard gauge locomotives of the United States